Owrta Bolagh (also Romanized as ' Owrtā Bolāgh and Ūrtā Bolāgh; also known as Arooteh Bolagh, Owrtah Bolāgh, Owrteh Bolāgh,  Urtahbulāq, and Urtakh-Bulag) is a village in Qareh Poshtelu-e Bala Rural District, Qareh Poshtelu District, Zanjan County, Zanjan Province, Iran. At the 2006 census, its population was 246, in 61 families.

References 

Populated places in Zanjan County